A DBCS, Double Byte Character Set, is an encoding in which characters are encoded in two bytes.

DBCS may also refer to:
 Delivery Bar Code Sorter, a machine used by the United States Postal Service
 Drakensberg Boys' Choir School, KwaZulu-Natal, South Africa
 Honda VFR800#Dual combined braking system (DCBS)

See also
 DBC (disambiguation)